The canton of Étampes is an administrative division of the Essonne department, Île-de-France region, northern France. Its borders were modified at the French canton reorganisation which came into effect in March 2015. Its seat is in Étampes.

It consists of the following communes:

Abbéville-la-Rivière
Angerville
Arrancourt
Authon-la-Plaine
Auvers-Saint-Georges
Blandy
Bois-Herpin
Boissy-la-Rivière
Boissy-le-Cutté
Boissy-le-Sec
Boutervilliers
Bouville
Brières-les-Scellés
Brouy
Cerny
Chalo-Saint-Mars
Chalou-Moulineux
Champmotteux
Chatignonville
Congerville-Thionville
D'Huison-Longueville
Étampes
Fontaine-la-Rivière
La Forêt-Sainte-Croix
Guillerval
Marolles-en-Beauce
Le Mérévillois
Mérobert
Mespuits
Monnerville
Morigny-Champigny
Ormoy-la-Rivière
Orveau
Plessis-Saint-Benoist
Puiselet-le-Marais
Pussay
Roinvilliers
Saclas
Saint-Cyr-la-Rivière
Saint-Escobille
Saint-Hilaire
Valpuiseaux
Vayres-sur-Essonne
Villeneuve-sur-Auvers

References

Cantons of Essonne